The sandstone night lizard (Xantusia gracilis) is a species of night lizard. Prior to 2005, it was considered a subspecies of the granite night lizard, Xantusia henshawi. The physical difference is that the sandstone night lizard has lighter coloration.

Range
The sandstone night lizard is extremely limited geographically; it is known only to the Truckhaven Rocks in the Colorado Desert, at Anza-Borrego Desert State Park in eastern San Diego County, California.

Description
The lizard is very secretive using small burrows and sandstone or siltstone for cover.

References 
This article is based on a description from the website of California Wildlife Habitat Relationships System https://web.archive.org/web/20060805132729/http://www.dfg.ca.gov/whdab/html/reptiles.html

Xantusia
Endemic fauna of California
Fauna of the Colorado Desert
Natural history of San Diego County, California
Reptiles described in 1986
Taxa named by Larry Lee Grismer